= Sharmah =

Coordinates: 15°59′N 48°56′E

- Interactive map of Sharmah
- Country: Yemen
- Governorate: Hadhramaut
- Time zone: UTC+3 (Yemen Standard Time)

Sharmah is a village in eastern Yemen. It is located in the Hadhramaut Governorate.
